James Patrick Ormonde (23 March 1903 – 30 November 1970) was a Scottish-born Australian politician. Born in Fife, he migrated to Australia as a child and was educated at Catholic schools in Maitland, New South Wales. He became a journalist first with the Labor Daily and then with the Sydney Morning Herald. In 1958, he was appointed to the Australian Senate as a Labor Senator for New South Wales, filling the casual vacancy resulting from the death of Labor Senator Bill Ashley. He was re-elected in the 1958 election, but the remainder of Ashley's term was filled by Colin McKellar; thus, Ormonde was not a Senator between 22 November 1958 and 1 July 1959. He remained in the Senate until his retirement in 1970; however, he died before his retirement took effect in 1971 and Jim McClelland, who had been elected to replace him, filled the vacancy.

References

Australian Labor Party members of the Parliament of Australia
Members of the Australian Senate for New South Wales
Members of the Australian Senate
1903 births
1970 deaths
20th-century Australian politicians